Daba is a type of human settlement in Georgia, a "small town". It is equivalent to an urban-type settlement in some other countries of the former Soviet Union.

In present-day Georgia, daba is typically defined as a settlement with the population of no less than 3,000 and established social and technical infrastructure, which enables it to function as a local economic and cultural center; it, furthermore, should not possess large agricultural lands. The status of daba can also be granted to a settlement with the population of less than 3,000, provided it functions as an administrative center of the district (municipality) or has a prospect of further economic and population growth in the nearest future.

Etymology
Daba is the term well known in Old Georgian, where it had the meaning "cornfield, hamlet". It is derived from a Common Kartvelian root *dab(a), which is also a source of the Svan däb, "cornfield", and, possibly, the Mingrelian dobera (dobira), "arable land".  The derivative words are udabno, "desert", and mdabali, "low". The name daba is also a basis for several placenames in Georgia, such as Daba, Akhaldaba ("new daba"), Q'veldaba ("cheese daba"), and Dabadzveli ("old daba").

List of daba in Georgia
As of 2011, 50 settlements are categorized in Georgia as daba. These, listed according to a population size (2002 census), are:

See also
List of cities and towns in Georgia

References

Urban geography
Types of populated places
Geography of Georgia (country)